Jack Wilkinson (16 August 1930 – 1992) was an English professional rugby league footballer who played in the 1940s, 1950s and 1960s, and coached in the 1960s. A Halifax (Heritage № 612) and Wakefield Trinity Hall of Fame inductee, he was a Great Britain and England international forward. Wilkinson also represented Yorkshire, and ended his career as captain-coach of Bradford Northern.

Background
Jack Wilkinson as born in Halifax, West Riding of Yorkshire, England, he was a classmate of wrestler Shirley "Big Daddy" Crabtree, and he died age 61 in Halifax, West Yorkshire, England.

Playing career

Halifax
Jack Wilkinson won caps for Great Britain while at Halifax between 1952 and 1956 against France (1 non-Test match). Wilkinson also represented England while at Halifax in 1953 against Other Nationalities. In the subsequent replay he played right-, i.e. number 10, in the 4–8 loss to Warrington which attracted a record crowd of 102,575, or more, to Odsal Stadium, Bradford on Wednesday 5 May 1954.

Wilkinson won caps for Great Britain while at Halifax in 1954 against Australia and New Zealand (2 matches). He also played for Rugby League XIII while at Halifax against France. Wilkinson played for England in 1955 against Other Nationalities. He won caps for Great Britain in 1955 against New Zealand (3 matches). Auckland defeated Great Britain 5-4 at Carlaw Park in a rough match which resulted in Wilkinson and Nat Silcock being sent off. Wilkinson played in the 2–13 defeat by St. Helens in the 1955–56 Challenge Cup Final during the 1955–56 season at Wembley Stadium, London on Saturday 28 April 1956. Wilkinson was selected for Yorkshire County XIII while at Halifax in 1959. Wilkinson's Testimonial match at Halifax took place in 1958.

Wakefield Trinity
Jack Wilkinson joined Wakefield Trinity from Halifax in 1959 for £4,500 (based on increases in average earnings, this would be approximately £207,900 in 2013). During the 1959–60 season Wilkinson played  left-, i.e. number 8, in Wakefield Trinity's 38–5 victory over Hull F.C. in the 1959–60 Challenge Cup Final during the 1959–60 season at Wembley Stadium, London on Saturday 14 May 1960, in front of a crowd of 79,773. He then played in the 3–27 loss against Wigan in the Rugby Football League Championship Final at Odsal Stadium, Bradford on Saturday, 21 May 1960.

Wilkinson was selected for Yorkshire County XIII while at Wakefield Trinity.

Wilkinson helped Great Britain to victory in the 1960 World Cup, playing in all three games, and scoring a try in the 33–7 victory over France on Saturday 1 October 1960 at Station Road, Swinton. Wilkinson played left- in the 12–6 victory over Huddersfield in the 1961–62 Challenge Cup Final during the 1961–62 season at Wembley Stadium, London on Saturday 12 May 1962, in front of a crowd of 81,263, and played left- in the 25–10 victory over Wigan in the 1962–63 Challenge Cup Final during the 1962–63 season at Wembley Stadium, London on Saturday 11 May 1963, in front of a crowd of 84,492.

Bradford Northern
Jack Wilkinson moved to Bradford Northern, as captain-coach in 1963. That year the film This Sporting Life which starred Richard Harris was released and in it Wilkinson is clearly visible as a rugby player in several scenes.

References

External links
Rugby League Cup Final 1960
Wakefield Win Cup 1962
Rugby League Final 1963
Photograph "Lord Mayor being presented to the side. - Lord Mayor (T.E. Hall) being presented to the team by Jack Wilkinson as Joe Phillips looks on. - Date: 24/08/1964" at rlhp.co.uk
Search for "Jack Wilkinson" at britishnewspaperarchive.co.uk

1930 births
1992 deaths
Bradford Bulls captains
Bradford Bulls coaches
Bradford Bulls players
England national rugby league team players
English rugby league coaches
English rugby league players
Great Britain national rugby league team players
Halifax R.L.F.C. players
Rugby league players from Halifax, West Yorkshire
Rugby league props
Rugby League XIII players
Wakefield Trinity players
Yorkshire rugby league team players